Dobrava is a nucleated village in the Municipality of Trebnje in eastern Slovenia. It lies on the southern edge of the municipality, northeast of Žužemberk. The area is part of the historical Lower Carniola region. The municipality is now included in the Southeast Slovenia Statistical Region.

The local church is dedicated to the Mother of God and belongs to the Parish of Dobrnič. It is a Gothic building with remnants of 14th-century frescos on the exterior walls. It was restyled in the Baroque in the second half of the 17th century.

References

External links

Dobrava at Geopedia

Populated places in the Municipality of Trebnje